The Confédération syndicale belge (Belgian Trade Union Confederation) was an Anarcho-syndicalist trade union movement in Belgium. The organization was founded in Liège on 19 April 1908. Confédération syndicale belge was the last of the various anarcho-syndicalist union movements formed in Belgium in the years prior to the First World War. The organization had around 10,000 members from Antwerp, Kortrijk, Brussels, Verviers, the Centre region and Liège. It was formed by the small revolutionary Confédération générale du travail (founded on 28 January 1906 in Brussels), the Antwerp diamond workers union (3,000 members), the glass workers union (Union Verrière) of Lodelinsart and others in reaction to the creation of the Commission syndicale, a trade-union confederation directly linked to, and under the orders of the Belgian Labour Party. In January 1910, the diamond workers union finally joined the Commission syndicale after a mediation by Camille Huysmans and Jan Van Zutphen, general secretary of the diamond general trade union of Amsterdam, the Algemene Nederlandse Diamantbewerkersbond. This ended the history of the Confédération syndicale belge, the last attempt to create a trade union independent from the Belgian Labour Party.

References

Trade unions in Belgium
1908 establishments in Belgium
Trade unions established in 1908
Anarcho-syndicalism
Socialism in Belgium